KKTL (1400 AM) is a commercial radio station licensed to Casper, Wyoming operating on 1400 kHz. KKTL airs a classic country music format. KKTL previously carried Coast to Coast AM before it was picked up by sister station  KTWO.

Signal
KKTL's transmitter is located in the town of Mills, Wyoming, a suburb of Casper. Its 1,000 watt signal can be heard throughout most of central Wyoming. KKTL's signal has been reported in Laramie, Wyoming.

History

Prior use of 1400 kHz

Casper's third radio station, KATI, operated on 1400 kHz from 1956 to 1987. For most of its history a contemporary station, KATI failed in 1987 as a result of a soft regional economy, the rise of FM station KTRS-FM, and a major debt to one of the station's prior owners. The license was donated to the University of Wyoming, but bids were rejected as too low and the cost of restoring it too high for the university, and UW let the license lapse in 1993.

KKTL
The 1400 AM frequency would be back in business in 1999 with talk radio and sports radio, with the playing of the national anthem.

On February 12, 2018, KKTL changed their format from ESPN sports to classic country, branded as "AM 1400 The Cowboy".

Previous logos

References

External links
KKTL official website

KTL
Classic country radio stations in the United States
Natrona County, Wyoming
Radio stations established in 1999
1999 establishments in Wyoming
Townsquare Media radio stations